This article attempts to list the oldest extant buildings surviving in the state of Florida in the United States of America, including the oldest houses in Florida and any other surviving structures. Some dates are approximate and based upon dendochronology, architectural studies, and historical records. Many sites on this list date to the complex colonial period of Florida's history from the founding of Spanish St. Augustine in 1565 to American possession through the Adams-Onis Treaty in 1821.  
To be listed here a site must
date from prior to 1821; or 
be the oldest building in a county, large city, or oldest of its type (church, government building, etc.),

See also
List of the oldest buildings in the United States
National Register of Historic Places listings in Florida

References 

Architecture in Florida
Oldest
Florida